Polyfyto is a village and a community in the regional unit of Kozani, northern Greece. It is part of the municipality of Velventos. The 2011 census recorded 7 inhabitants in the village.

References

External links
Polyfyto  Hydroelectric Power Plant Greece on Global Energy Observatory
 Seismic hazard assessment in Polyphyto Dam area (NW Greece) and its relation with the "unexpected" earthquake of 13 May 1995 (Ms = 6.5, NW Greece),by Nat. Hazards Earth Syst. Sci., 13, 141–149, https://doi.org/10.5194/nhess-13-141-2013, 2013.)

Populated places in Kozani (regional unit)